Juan Miguel "Juanmi" Gelabert Margüello (born 19 September 1972), sometimes known as just Juanmi, is a Spanish retired footballer who played as a central defender or a left back.

Football career
Born in Capdepera, Majorca, Balearic Islands, Gelabert played five of his first seven years as a senior in the third division, his only season in the second level being 1997–98 with Elche CF (39 games, all starts, team relegation). In the following campaign he signed for Valencian neighbours Hércules CF – in the same category – and met the same fate.

In 2000–01, Gelabert returned to division two with Recreativo de Huelva. His solid performances attracted the attention of another Andalusian club, Sevilla CF, which had promoted to La Liga in precisely that season, but he was used sparingly during his spell with his new team, only playing in five games in his second year.

Gelabert played his final four seasons as a professional in the second tier, with Córdoba CF and Sporting de Gijón. In 2007, after having been hit by a ball in his left eye in a match against Cádiz CF, he was forced to retired from football, at the age of 34. He immediately began working towards obtaining his coaching license and as a director of football, adding some appearances as a sports commentator.

In the 2011–12 season, Gelabert returned to Hércules as head of the youth ranks.

References

External links

1972 births
Living people
Spanish footballers
Footballers from Mallorca
Association football defenders
La Liga players
Segunda División players
Segunda División B players
CF Palencia footballers
Elche CF players
Hércules CF players
Recreativo de Huelva players
Sevilla FC players
Córdoba CF players
Sporting de Gijón players